William Russell Willcox (April 11, 1863 – April 9, 1940) was an American politician from New York. On January 1, 1905 he became the Postmaster of New York City. By 1909 he was chairman of the New York Public Service Commission. He served on the Railway Wage Commission in 1918.

Biography

He was born on April 11, 1863 in Smyrna, New York to Thomas L. Willcox. He attended the state normal school in Brockport, New York. He later attended the University of Rochester.

He served as principal of the Webster Academy and Spring Valley High School. He then attended Columbia Law School, and was admitted to the bar in 1890.

Around 1901 Mayor Seth Low appointed him to the New York City Department of Parks and Recreation where he served for two years as president of the commission.

In 1904, he married Martha J. Havemeyer, descendant of Mayor William Frederick Havemeyer.

On January 1, 1905 he became the Postmaster of New York City. He was appointed by Theodore Roosevelt.

On July 1, 1907 he became chairman of the New York Public Service Commission.

Willcox served as chairman of the Republican National Committee from 1916 to 1918. He encouraged Republican congressmen during votes for the 19th Amendment

Willcox resigned after being appointed to the Railway Wage Commission, also known as the U.S. Railroad Commission in 1918. Others appointed by the Woodrow Wilson administration were U.S. Secretary of the Interior Franklin Knight Lane, Charles Caldwell McChord of the Interstate Commerce Commission and D.C. chief justice J. Harry Covington. The commission investigated railroad wages.

He became a widower in 1939. He died on April 9, 1940 a Southside Hospital in Bayshore, New York.

References

External links

William Russell Willcox at Political Graveyard

1863 births
1940 deaths
Columbia Law School alumni
New York (state) lawyers
New York (state) Republicans
New York City Department of Parks and Recreation
New York Public Service Commission
People from Chenango County, New York
Postmasters of New York City
Railway Wage Commission
Republican National Committee chairs
University of Rochester alumni